Esizi Poyon (Russian and Tajik: Эсизи Поён) is a village in Sughd Region, northwestern Tajikistan. It is part of the jamoat Ivan-Tojik in the Kuhistoni Mastchoh District.

References

Populated places in Sughd Region